Peter Seiffert (born 4 January 1954) is a German tenor.

Biography 

Born in Düsseldorf, Seiffert studied at the Musikhochschule in Düsseldorf and made his debut in 1978 at the Deutschen Oper am Rhein, Düsseldorf/Duisburg. In 1979, he was awarded a second place in the Deutscher Musikwettbewerb (German Music Competition), and appeared on the TV show Anneliese Rothenberger gibt sich die Ehre (Anneliese Rothenberger has the honour [of meeting ...]).

In 1986, he married the soprano Lucia Popp, 15 years his senior. She died in 1993, after which he married another soprano, Petra-Maria Schnitzer.

He established his career at the Bayreuth Festival, regularly appearing in the title role of Lohengrin, which he last performed in 2005 with his wife Schnitzer in the role of Elsa. In 2003 he was awarded the Grammy Award for Best Opera Recording, for his performance of Tannhäuser, under Daniel Barenboim. Today, he is a sought-after Heldentenor, singing many of the title roles of Wagner's best-known operas.

Sources 
Most of the information in this article is taken from the German Wikipedia article.

External links 

Biography at the Bayerischen Staatsoper 

German operatic tenors
1954 births
Living people
Musicians from Düsseldorf
Österreichischer Kammersänger
20th-century German  male opera singers
21st-century German  male opera singers
Robert Schumann Hochschule alumni